Route 367 is a 100 km two-lane north-south highway on the north shore of the Saint Lawrence River in Quebec, Canada. Although it is technically a north-south highway, long stretches of the road are east-west. Its northern/western terminus is close to Lac-aux-Sables at the junction of Route 363 and the southern/eastern terminus is in Saint-Augustin-de-Desmaures at the junction of Route 138. Route 367 used to end in Rivière-à-Pierre, but in the late 1990ss, thea stretch between Rivière-à-Pierre and the junction of Route 363 was added.

Towns along Route 367

 Notre-Dame-de-Montauban
 Rivière-à-Pierre
 Saint-Léonard-de-Portneuf
 Saint-Raymond
 Lac-Sergent
 Sainte-Catherine-de-la-Jacques-Cartier
 Saint-Augustin-de-Desmaures

Major intersections

See also
 List of Quebec provincial highways

References

External links 

 Provincial Route Map (Courtesy of the Quebec Ministry of Transportation) 
Route 367 on Google Maps

367
Roads in Capitale-Nationale